Living on Love is a 1937 American film.

Living on Love may also refer to:

Livin' on Love, a 2002 album by Ilse de Lange
"Livin' on Love", a 1994 song by Alan Jackson
"Living On Love", a 2000 song by John Berry from the album Faces

See also
Living on Love Alone, a 2010 French film